Ryanne Alyse Brown (born January 21, 1999) is an American professional soccer player who plays as a defender for OL Reign of the American National Women's Soccer League (NWSL).

Club career 
OL Reign drafted Brown as the No. 21 overall pick of the 2022 NWSL Draft. She made her NWSL debut on July 17, 2022.

On July 29, 2022, Brown signed a contract extension with OL Reign and joined Danish club FC Nordsjælland on loan.

Personal life 
Brown's brother is professional soccer player Jalen Brown, and Philippines international Sarina Bolden is their cousin.

References 

Living people
1999 births
American women's soccer players
OL Reign players
Wake Forest Demon Deacons women's soccer players
Women's association football defenders
Women's association football forwards
National Women's Soccer League players